Ou Sralau  is a khum (commune) of Malai District in Banteay Meanchey Province in north-western Cambodia.

Villages

 Ou Sralau
 Phnum Kaubei
 Kandaol
 Chheu Teal
 Bueng Reang
 Svay Prey
 Chan Kiri
 Thmei

References

Communes of Banteay Meanchey province
Malai District